"Heartbreaker" is a song by the English rock band Led Zeppelin, released from their 1969 album, Led Zeppelin II. It was credited to all four members of the band, recorded at A&R Recording and Atlantic Studios in New York City during the band's second concert tour of North America, and engineered by Eddie Kramer.

"Heartbreaker" opens the second side of the album and features a guitar riff by Jimmy Page. It also includes a spontaneous unaccompanied solo, using a pull-off technique, which was voted the 16th-greatest guitar solo of all time by Guitar World magazine. "Heartbreaker" was ranked number 320 in 2004 by Rolling Stone magazine, in their 500 Greatest Songs of All Time, and number 328 in 2010.

Recording
In a 1998 interview with Guitar World, Page commented that the guitar solo was recorded in a different studio, thereby giving a different sound than the rest of the song.  He added that this was the first recorded instance of his Gibson Les Paul/Marshall Stack combination.  Brett Milano of uDiscover Music rated the guitar solo as one of the 100 all-time greatest.

Influence
"Heartbreaker" is one of the songs featured in Nick Hornby's book 31 Songs. Record producer Rick Rubin has remarked, "One of the greatest riffs in rock. It ["Heartbreaker"] starts, and it's like they don't really know where the "one" is. Magical in its awkwardness." Eddie Van Halen once claimed the "Heartbreaker" solo as the inspiration behind his adoption of the tapping technique he later popularized. In one review with Guitar World, he said:

Steve Vai has also commented about it in a September 1998 Guitar World interview: "This one [Heartbreaker] had the biggest impact on me as a youth. It was defiant, bold, and edgier than hell. It really is the definitive rock guitar solo."

See also
List of cover versions of Led Zeppelin songs"Heartbreaker" entries

References

1969 songs
Atlantic Records singles
Led Zeppelin songs
Nirvana (band) songs
The Black Crowes songs
Songs written by Jimmy Page
Songs written by Robert Plant
Songs written by John Paul Jones (musician)
Songs written by John Bonham
Song recordings produced by Jimmy Page